Gandhinagar Capital–Bhavnagar Terminus Intercity Express is an express train belonging to Western Railway zone that runs between Gandhinagar Capital and Bhavnagar Terminus in India. It is currently being operated with 19203/19204 train numbers on a daily basis.

Service

19203 Gandhinagar Capital–Bhavnagar Terminus Intercity Express has an average speed of 50 km/hr and covers 310 km in 6 hours 10 minutes.
19204 Bhavnagar Terminus–Gandhinagar Capital Intercity Express has an average speed of 49 km/hr and covers 310 km in 6 hours 10 minutes.

Schedule

Route

Coach composition

The train consists of 10 coaches:

 8 General Unreserved
 2 End-on Generator

Traction

Both trains are hauled by a Vatva Loco Shed diesel WDM-3A locomotive from Gandhinagar to Bhavnagar and vice versa.

See also 

 Gandhinagar Capital railway station
 Bhavnagar Terminus
 Bhavnagar Terminus–Udhampur Janmabhoomi Express

References 

Transport in Gandhinagar
Intercity Express (Indian Railways) trains
Rail transport in Gujarat
Transport in Bhavnagar